Baap Re Baap may refer to:
 Baap Re Baap (1955 film), directed by A. R. Kardar
 Baap Re Baap (2019 film), directed by Sagar Kalaria